Nomathemba Hendrietta Maseko-Jele (born 22 October 1964) is a South African politician who is a Member of the National Assembly of South Africa representing the African National Congress (ANC).

Education
Maseko-Jele holds a teachers high diploma. She graduated from the University of South Africa with a Bachelor of Arts in education. She also earned a BA degree in music and a performing arts management degree from the University of the Witwatersrand. She completed a Higher Diploma in law at the University of Johannesburg. She is currently studying for a LLB through UNISA.

Political career
Maseko-Jele serves on the provincial working committee (PWC) of the African National Congress Women's League in Gauteng. She formerly served as the regional secretary of the ANC women's league. Maseko-Jele served as the first secretary of the ANC Grace Flathela Zone, as the first female chairperson of ANC Ward 60 branch in Ekurhuleni, and as the first Ekurhuleni Women's Forum chairwoman.

Maseko-Jele stood for the provincial legislature in 2014 as a candidate low on the ANC provincial legislature list and was not elected.

Parliamentary career
Maseko-Jele stood for the National Assembly in 2019 and was elected from the ANC's regional list in Gauteng. She is currently a member of the  Portfolio Committee on Justice and Correctional Services and the  Constitutional Review Committee.

References

External links

Living people
1964 births
University of South Africa alumni
University of the Witwatersrand alumni
African National Congress politicians
Members of the National Assembly of South Africa
Women members of the National Assembly of South Africa